FringePedia is a wiki-powered online encyclopedia of information regarding the American science fiction television series Fringe. Launched on July 23, 2008, by Dennis Acevedo, the site uses MediaWiki software to maintain a user-created database of information. It is the largest, fan-generated, online encyclopedia for Fringe, and is intended to be the most comprehensive source data about the show. The site is not affiliated with Warner Bros. Entertainment, Bad Robot Productions, FB2 Films Inc., DC Comics/Wildstorm, or any other persons or organizations responsible for the production, promotion or distribution of Fringe.

History
Designed by Dennis Acevedo, the website was launched on 23 July 2008, one day after Fringe was originally screened at San Diego Comic-Con International. Acevedo created the site to allow fans to "organize, read, better understand and better enjoy the extensive amount of information" presented during the popular science-fiction saga.

Impact
Five months after its launch, Andrew Hanson from the Los Angeles Times recommended FringePedia as a "pool of collective knowledge" that's "fun for everyone". In 2011, Into the Looking Glass: Exploring the Worlds of Fringe author Sarah Clarke Stuart referred to FringePedia as the "main" wiki site for fans, explaining that the site is "reliable in its archiving of episodes and episode transcripts." However, Clarke Stuart did criticize FringePedia for not keeping its homepage announcements up-to-date.

Shutdown
Fringepedia ceased operation in early 2017 for unknown reasons.

References

External links
Archived website June 2017

American online encyclopedias
MediaWiki websites
Science fiction websites
Fringe (TV series)
Creative Commons-licensed websites